United Nations Security Council resolution 875, adopted unanimously on 16 October 1993, after recalling resolutions 841 (1993), 861 (1993), 862 (1993), 867 (1993) and 873 (1993), the council, aware of the continued failure of parties in Haiti implement the Governors Island Agreement, widened international sanctions and imposed a naval blockade against the country.

The sanctions were a further measure aimed at removing the military junta in Haiti and restoring democracy. Acting under Chapter VII and Chapter VIII of the United Nations Charter, the Council called upon member states to halt inward maritime shipping as necessary in order to inspect and verify their cargoes and destinations, as well as implement restrictions on petroleum and liquefied natural gas in accordance with previous resolutions.

The resolution concluded by stating that further measures would be taken if necessary to ensure compliance.

See also
 History of Haiti
 List of United Nations Security Council Resolutions 801 to 900 (1993–1994)

References

External links
 
Text of the Resolution at undocs.org

 0875
1993 in Haiti
 0875
United Nations Security Council sanctions regimes
October 1993 events